Michael Patrick Driscoll (August 8, 1939 – October 24, 2017) was an American prelate of the Roman Catholic Church. He was the seventh Bishop of Boise. He retired on August 8, 2014.

Early life and ministry
Michael Driscoll was born in Long Beach, California. As a child, he would pretend to celebrate Mass, giving Necco candy wafers as communion to his younger siblings. He attended St. John's Seminary in Camarillo, and was ordained to the priesthood by James Cardinal McIntyre on May 1, 1965.

He did pastoral work in Los Angeles and Burbank, and earned a Master's degree in Social Work from the University of Southern California in 1973. He served as Chancellor (1976–1987), Vicar for Religious and for Charities, and Vicar General in the Diocese of Orange.

Episcopal career
On December 19, 1989, Driscoll was appointed Auxiliary Bishop of Orange and Titular Bishop of Maxita by Pope John Paul II. He received his episcopal consecration on March 6, 1990 from Bishop Norman McFarland, with Bishops John Steinbock and Thomas Connolly serving as co-consecrators.

Driscoll was later named Bishop of Boise, Idaho, on January 18, 1999. Replacing Bishop Tod Brown, he was formally installed on the following March 17. After 15 years with the Diocese of Boise, Bishop Driscoll retired on August 8, 2014 and Bishop Peter Christensen was named his successor.

Diocese of Boise Bishop Michael Driscoll apologized for his role in Orange County, California's Roman Catholic Church sex-abuse scandal. Driscoll, who was in charge of priest personnel affairs for the Diocese of Orange County from its 1976 inception until leaving for Idaho in 1999, made the stunning admission in a letter printed in the Idaho Catholic Register, stating he was "deeply sorry for the way we handled cases [in Orange County] allowed children to be victimized by permitting some priests to remain in ministry, for not disclosing their behavior to those who might be at risk, and for not monitoring their actions more closely."
A Los Angeles Superior Court judge was expected to release priest personnel files that were supposed to become public as part of a $100-million settlement reached in 2005 between the Orange diocese and sex-abuse victims, the largest in the history of the Catholic Church. Church sources say Driscoll's name is all over the documents, which molestation survivors claim will show the various cover-ups Orange County diocesan officials executed while Driscoll served as chancellor and auxiliary bishop.

References

External links
Roman Catholic Diocese of Boise

1939 births
2017 deaths
People from Long Beach, California
St. John's Seminary (California) alumni
USC Suzanne Dworak-Peck School of Social Work alumni
Roman Catholic Archdiocese of Los Angeles
Roman Catholic Diocese of Orange
Roman Catholic bishops of Boise
20th-century Roman Catholic bishops in the United States
21st-century Roman Catholic bishops in the United States
Catholics from California